Miskolc (Czech and ; ;) is a city in northeastern Hungary, known for its heavy industry. With a population of 161,265 (1 Jan 2014) Miskolc is the fourth largest city in Hungary (behind Budapest, Debrecen, and Szeged). It is also the county capital of Borsod-Abaúj-Zemplén and the regional centre of Northern Hungary.

Etymology
The name derives from Miško, Slavic form of Michael.  Miškovec → Miskolc  with the same development as Lipovec → Lipólc, Lipóc. The name is associated with the Miskolc clan (also Miskóc or Myscouch, Slovak Miškovec, plural Miškovci) named after the settlement or vice versa. Earliest mentions are que nunc vocatur Miscoucy (around 1200), de Myschouch (1225), Ponyt de genere Myscouch (1230), in Miscovcy (1245).

Geography 

The city lies at the meeting point of different geographical regions – east from the Bükk mountains, in the valley of the river Sajó and the streams Hejő and Szinva.

The area belongs to the Great Plain region and is made up of sedimentary rocks. Between the Avas hill and Diósgyőr lies the hilly area of the Lower Bükk consisting of sandstone, marl, clay, layers of coal, from the tertiary period, and volcanic rocks from the Miocene.

The surface was formed mostly by karstic erosions.

This mostly consists of sea sediments (limestone, slate, dolomite) from the Paleozoic and Mesozoic, and volcanic rocks like diabase and porphyry. Several caves can be found in the area.

Climate
Summers are fresh but sometimes warm and humid in Miskolc. Snow and ice are dominant during the winter season. Miskolc receives about 120 centimetres of snowfall annually. Days below freezing and nights below  both occur in the winter.

History 

The area has been inhabited since ancient times – archaeological findings date back to the Paleolithic, proving human presence for over 70,000 years . Its first known dwellers were the Cotini, one of the Celt tribes. The area has been occupied by Hungarians since the "Conquest" in the late 9th century. It was first mentioned by this name around 1210 AD. The Miskóc clan lost their power when King Charles I centralized his power by curbing the power of the oligarchs.

Miskolc was elevated to the rank of oppidum (market town) in 1365 by King Louis I. He also had the castle of the nearby town Diósgyőr (now a district of Miskolc) transformed into a Gothic fortress. The city developed in a dynamic way, but during the Ottoman occupation of most of Hungary the development of Miskolc was brought to a standstill. The Turks took Miskolc in 1544 and the city prospered further until 1687. It was also ruled by Ottomans after Battle of Mezőkeresztes in 1596 as part of Eyalet of Egir until 1687. It was during these years that Miskolc became an important centre of wine-growing. By the end of the 17th century the population of the city was as large as that of Kassa/Košice, and 13 guilds had been founded.

During the war of independence against Habsburg rule in the early 18th century, Prince Francis II Rákóczi, the leader of the Hungarians put his headquarters in Miskolc. The imperial forces sacked and burnt the city in 1707. Four years later half of the population fell victim of a cholera epidemic. Miskolc recovered quickly, and another age of prosperity began again. In 1724, Miskolc was chosen to be the city where the county hall of Borsod county would be built. Many other significant buildings were built in the 18th and 19th centuries, including the city hall, schools such as Lévay József Református Gimnázium és Diákotthon, churches, the synagogue, and the theatre. The theatre is commonly regarded as the first stone-built theatre of Hungary, although the first one was actually built in Kolozsvár (then a part of Hungary, now Cluj-Napoca, Romania). According to the first nationally held census (1786) the city had a population of 14,719, and 2,414 houses.

These years brought prosperity, but the cholera epidemic of 1873 and the flood of 1878 took many lives. Several buildings were destroyed by the flood, but bigger and grander buildings were built in their places. World War I did not affect the city directly, but many people died, either from warfare or from the cholera epidemic. It was occupied by Czechoslovak troops between 1918 and 1919 after the First World War.

After the Treaty of Trianon, Hungary lost Kassa (today Košice, Slovakia) and Miskolc became the sole regional center of northern Hungary. This was one of the reasons for the enormous growth of the city during the 1930s and 1940s.

Early in World War II Hungary became an ally of Nazi Germany. Unhappy with the Hungarian government, German troops occupied Hungary on March 19, 1944 and put the anti-semitic Arrow Cross Party in charge of the government. Jews in Miskolc and elsewhere were ordered to wear yellow stars on their clothing. Under the supervision of Nazi SS-Obersturmbannführer Adolf Eichmann, "deportations" from Miskolc began on June 11 or 12th, 1944. Over 14,000 Jewish adults and children were sent by cattle car to Auschwitz, where most were gassed on arrival. After the war Jews who survived the holocaust returned to Miskolc hoping to reclaim their land and possessions.  Over 130 were rounded up by members of the local Arrow Cross Party and summarily murdered. The Jewish cemetery on a hill overlooking Miskolc  has a memorial for them.  It includes the 10 commandments, carved in stone, all written in Hebrew except Thou shall not kill, which is written in Hungarian.

The preparation for World War II established Miskolc as the national centre of heavy industry, a position the city maintained until the 1990s. Although Miskolc suffered a lot during the last year of the war, it recovered quickly, and by absorbing the surrounding villages, it became the second-largest city of Hungary with more than 200,000 inhabitants.

On July 30 and August 1, 1946, the Miskolc pogrom led to death of one accused Jewish black marketeer, the wounding of another, and subsequently the death of a Jewish policeman. Economic hardship and anti-Semitism motivated the riots.

In 1949, the University of Miskolc was founded (as a successor of the Academy of Mining, formerly in Selmecbánya, which is now Banská Štiavnica, Slovakia).

During its long history Miskolc survived fires, floods, plagues and foreign invasions, but maintained its position as the centre of northeastern Hungary. The 1990s brought a crisis in the iron industry with a decline in the population.

Miskolc is now trying to become known as a cultural – instead of merely an industrial – city. Among the various cultural events, one of the most important festivities is the International Opera Festival, held every summer.

Tourist destinations in Miskolc include Tapolca, Lillafüred and Felsőhámor. Tapolca has a park with a boating pond and the unique Cave Bath. Lillafüred and Felsőhámor are pretty villages in a valley surrounded by mountains and forests; their sights include the Hotel Palace on the shore of the Lake Hámori, the Szinva waterfall (the highest waterfall of the country), the Anna Cave and the István Cave.

Historical population 

The population (around 1910) is multidenominational and multiethnical, and the differences in the level of education mirrors the stratification of society, following these facts.  http://mek.oszk.hu/16900/16992

Economy 

Miskolc is generally thought of as an industrial city, and the largest boost to its economy was indeed provided by the industrialization during the Socialist era; in fact industry (including metallurgy) has a long history in the city.

Miskolc was already an important market town in the Middle Ages, mostly due to its proximity to the main trade routes of the region. In regards of the economy, real development started only after the Ottoman occupation. In the 18th century, the town already had a lumber mill, a paper manufacture, a brewery, a gunpowder factory and fifteen mills on the Szinva stream. The glass works manufactures and iron furnaces appeared in the late 18th and early 19th centuries. The first iron furnace, built by Henrik Fazola around 1770, did not survive, but the second one, built in 1813, can still be visited. Several new settlements were formed in the Bükk mountains to provide dwellings for the workers of glass works manufactures and furnaces. Many of them – including Alsóhámor, Felsőhámor, Ómassa and Bükkszentlászló – are now parts of Miskolc.

Development quickened from the second half of the 19th century, partly because of the political situation (after the Ausgleich) and partly because of the newly constructed railway line. A large furnace (second largest in the country) was built in Diósgyőr, and several other factories were built. The mining industry became more and more important, too. Within forty years the population doubled. The industrialization led to the forming of Greater Miskolc with the unification of Miskolc and Diósgyőr (1945) and several nearby towns and villages (between 1950 and 1981). The unification was only the first step in Miskolc being developed into an industrial centre. Development reached its highest point in the 1980s, when the metal factory had more than 18,000 workers and production was over one million tons per year. The population hit all-time record (over 200,000 inhabitants), ⅔ of the working people worked in heavy industry.

The economic recession after the end of the Socialist era hit the industrial cities of Northern Hungary the hardest. The unemployment rate rose until it became one of the highest in the country, the population of Miskolc dramatically decreased (not only because of unemployment though, but also due to suburbanization which became prevalent nationwide). The economic situation of the city went through a change, smaller enterprises appeared in place of the large state-owned companies.

By the early 2000s the decade of changes was over, and the city went through the recession successfully. International companies and supermarkets appeared in the area. The local government is trying to strengthen the city's role in culture and tourism. By the end of 2004, the highway M3 had reached the city.

Sports 
The most popular sport in Miskolc is football. The leading club of the city is Diósgyőri VTK (short name: DVTK). They have won the Hungarian Cup several times and represented Hungary many times in Europe. The capacity of the stadium, DVTK Stadion, is 26,000 (15,000 of which are in use), but it is now in poor condition due to decay, except for the new grandstand. The new board plans to build a new 15,000-seater stadium with under-soil heating and fully covered stands.

The other team, Miskolci VSC, plays in the county division. Miskolc has got other former first division representatives, namely Miskolci Attila (seven seasons at the highest level), and Perecesi TK (one).

Football teams 
Diósgyőri VTK
Miskolci VSC
Miskolci AK
Perecesi TK

Miskolc's most successful women's basketball team, DKSK Miskolc MISI, has won the National Cup twice.

The DVTK Jegesmedvék ice hockey team plays in the Slovak-based Tipsport Liga. The team's home rink, Miskolc Ice Hall, is in the People's Garden downtown. It has 1 304 seats, a total capacity of 2 200, and opened in 2006.

The women's volleyball team of MVSC also plays at the highest Hungarian level.

Speedway Miskolc joined the Polish Second League in 2005 and achieved serious results. They won the 2007 European Speedway Club Champions' Cup with World champion Jason Crump.

City parts of Miskolc

Avas 

The Avas is a hill in the heart of Miskolc. On the hilltop stands the Avas lookout tower, the symbol of the city. On the northern part of the hill, close to downtown Erzsébet Square, is the Gothic Protestant Church of Avas, one of the two oldest buildings of Miskolc (the other is the Castle of Diósgyőr.) The limestone caves of Avas are used as wine cellars; the narrow, winding streets give a Mediterranean atmosphere to this part of Avas Hill. The southern part of Avas, also called Avas-South, is where the largest housing estate of the city stands, with 10-story Socialist-style concrete buildings providing homes for about one-third of the city's population.

Belváros (City centre) 
Miskolc's city centre is not as rich in monuments as that of other cities; only the Main Street (Széchenyi St.), Városház tér (City Hall Square) and Erzsébet tér (Elizabeth Square) have preserved the 19th-century style of the town. There are not only historical buildings but also modern shopping malls and offices in the city centre.

Diósgyőr 
The other town forming today's Greater Miskolc is mostly famous for its medieval castle. Miskolc's football team also got its name from Diósgyőr, since their stadium stands there. Historical Diósgyőr is connected to Historical Miskolc by a district called Új(diós)győr (Újgyőr); its main square is an important traffic hub. Also in Új(diós)győr (Diósgyőr-Vasgyár) stands the steel factory that made Miskolc the most important heavy industrial city of Hungary (and earned it the nickname "Steel City"). Diósgyőri Gimnázium also stands in this district.

Egyetemváros (University Town) 
The University of Miskolc is among the newer ones. It was founded in the 1950s, so its buildings are not old, historical ones. University Town is one of the newer parts of the city and can be found between Miskolc and the holiday resort Miskolctapolca. The university, the campus, and the sport facilities are surrounded by a large park.

Hejőcsaba and Görömböly 
Two former villages that were annexed to the city in 1945 and 1950. Görömböly still looks like a small town of its own.

Lillafüred 
Another holiday resort, Miskolc-Lillafüred, is a village surrounded by the Bükk mountains. Its most notable building is the Palace Hotel (Palotaszálló).

Martin-Kertváros 
Martin-Kertváros (in Slovak: Martinská osada) is a suburban area.

Miskolctapolca 
One of the most well-known holiday resorts in the country, Tapolca (officially Miskolctapolca or Miskolc-Tapolca to avoid confusion with the Transdanubian town of the same name) is the home of the unique Cave Bath, a natural cave with thermal water. Tapolca is quite far from the city centre and counts as one of the posh areas of Miskolc. It is a popular tourist attraction.

Alsóhámor, Bükkszentlászló, Felsőhámor, Ómassa, Szirma 
These former villages were annexed to the city in 1950 (Bükkszentlászló in 1981) and are still separated villages, connected to the city only by its public transport system.

Main sights

Downtown 
 Main street and City Hall Square with the atmosphere of Hungarian towns of the 19th century
 Gothic Protestant Church of the Avas Hill
 Greek Orthodox Church with the largest iconostasis in Central Europe
 House of Arts with two art cinemas
 Kós House (designed by Károly Kós in Art Nouveau and folk style, 1931)
 Mindszent Church
 Minorite Church and Heroes' Square
 Miskolc-Avas TV Tower
 National Theatre of Miskolc
 Csodamalom Puppet Theatre
 Ottó Herman Museum
 Palace of Music
 Wooden Church

Diósgyőr 
 Castle of Diósgyőr (built in the 13th century, had its prime during the reign of Louis the Great; medieval castle plays are held in every August)
 Lutheran church of Diósgyőr
 Protestant church of Diósgyőr (Baroque, built on the ruins of a mediaeval monastery)

Lillafüred 
 Anna Cave, István Cave, Szeleta Cave
 Hotel Palace
 Lake Hámori
 Trout Farm
 Waterfalls (the highest one in Hungary)
There is a narrow-gauge railway that connects Lillafüred to Miskolc known as the Lillafüredi Állami Erdei Vasút (Lillafüred Forest State Railway). It winds through scenic forests, and takes between a half hour and 45 minutes for the train to go between the two major stops. The Miskolc stop is located in Diósgyőr.

Miskolctapolca 
 Cave Bath of Miskolctapolca

Near to the city 
 Bánkút ski resort
 Bükk Mountains
 Miskolc Zoo
 Ruins of the monastery at Szentlélek
 Castell Earl Andrassy Tiszadob

Festivals 
 Diósgyőr Castle Plays (every May and August)
 International Soldiers and Military Bands Festival (every two years in August)
 Jelly festival (February)
 Miskolc Opera Festival (every summer)
 Miskolc International Film Festival (every September)

Public transport 

Public transport in Miskolc is provided by the company MVK Zrt., owned by the local government. There are 36 bus lines and 2 tram lines. The first tram entered service on July 10, 1897 (making Miskolc the third city in Hungary to have a tram line), the first scheduled bus line started on June 8, 1903 (first in the country as well.) Today the public transport of Miskolc is one of the best ones in Hungary. There are several taxi companies too.

The Lillafüred Forest Train connects Diósgyőr to Lillafüred. It is mainly a tourist attraction.

The city has two railway stations (Tiszai and Gömöri) and a small unpaved airport, which is not open to the public, used mainly as a sports facility and has no role in public transport since 1963.

Politics 
The current mayor of Miskolc is Pál Veres (Independent).

The local Municipal Assembly, elected at the 2019 local government elections, is made up of 28 members (1 Mayor, 19 Individual constituencies MEPs and 8 Compensation List MEPs) divided into this political parties and alliances:

List of mayors

List of City Mayors from 1990:

Notable individuals 

Including people born in Miskolc as well as in Diósgyőr and other city parts that were independent towns at the time of their birth.
 Bela Borsody Bevilaqua (1885–1962) Cultural historian
 Péter Biros (born 1976) water polo player
 Gizella Bodnár, "Airplane Gizi" (1926-2019) thief
 Alan A. Brown (1928–2010) economist
 Gábor Dayka (1769–1796) poet
 Ferenc Demjén (born 1941) singer
 Sándor Ferenczi (1873–1933) psychoanalyst
 Dezső Földes (1880–1950) 2x Olympic champion saber fencer
 Endre Granat (born 1937) violinist
 Alexander Grossmann (1909–2003) Swiss writer, journalist
 Károly Grósz (1930–1996) politician, president
 Dezső Gyarmati (1927–2013) water polo player
 Szabolcs Huszti (born 1983) football player
 István Jónyer (born 1950) table tennis player
 Julius Leopold Klein (1810–1876) German writer
 Róza Laborfalvi (1817–1886) actress
 Regina Margareten (1863–1959) businesswoman
 Dénes Pál (born 1991), singer
 László Palóczy (1783–1861) politician
 Emeric Pressburger (1902–1988) Academy Award–winning movie director/writer/producer
 Sándor Puhl (1955–2021) football referee
 Ladislau Raffinsky (1905–1981), Romanian football player
 Ede Reményi (1828–1898) violinist
 Attila Repka (born 1968) wrestler, Olympic champion
 Sándor Rónai (1892–1965) politician, president
 Anna Rudolf (born 1987) chess player, international master, evangelist and reporter, a.k.a. Miss Strategy
 Andrei Șaguna (1809–1873) Romanian political leader, Orthodox Metropolitan bishop of Transylvania
 Vera Schmidt (born 1982) singer-songwriter
 Júlia Sebestyén (born 1981) figure skater, European champion
 Lőrinc Szabó (1900–1957) poet
 Vilmos Vanczák (born 1983) footballer
 Bálint Vécsei, (born 1993) footballer

Lived in Miskolc 
 Ferenc Bessenyei (Hódmezővásárhely, 1919 – Lajosmizse, 2004) actor
 Béni Egressy (Sajókazinc, 1814 – Budapest, 1851) composer
 Ottó Herman (Breznóbánya, 1835 – Miskolc, 1914) ornithologist, archaeologist, ethnographer
 Pavol Országh Hviezdoslav (Felsőkubin, 1849 – Alsókubin, 1921) Slovak poet
 Margit Kaffka (Nagykároly, 1880 – Budapest, 1918) writer
 Teréz Karacs (Budapest, 1808 – Békés, 1892) pioneer in women's education
 Béla Kondor (Pestlőrinc, 1931 – Budapest, 1972) graphic artist
 Leo Lánczy (Pest, 1852 – Budapest, 1921) deputy
 Ferenc Pulszky (Eperjes, 1814 – Budapest, 1897) politician, archaeologist, writer
 Bertalan Szemere (Vatta, 1818 – Budapest, 1869) politician

Gallery

Twin towns – sister cities

Miskolc is twinned with:

 Asan, South Korea
 Aschaffenburg, Germany
 Burgas, Bulgaria
 Cleveland, United States
 Katowice, Poland
 Kayseri, Turkey
 Košice, Slovakia
 Ostrava, Czech Republic
 Tampere, Finland

 Yantai, China

See also

Outline of Hungary
Avasi Grammar School
Miskolc metropolitan area

References and notes

Notes

External links 

Official sites of the city and city parts
  in Hungarian, English and German
 Official website of Miskolc tourism 
 Official website of Miskolc tourist card 

Webcams and image galleries
 Webcam view of downtown area (interactive cam)
 City Hall Square webcam
 Webcam view of Hotel Palace, Lillafüred
 Aerial photography: Miskolc

Education and culture
 Official site of the Castle of Diósgyőr  
 Opera Festival  
 University of Miskolc

Other
 Miskolc Online 
 Getting Medieval (an article in the Budapest Sun)
 Trams in Miskolc  
 Miskolc at funiq.hu 

 
Miskolc
Cities with county rights of Hungary
Populated places in Borsod-Abaúj-Zemplén County
Danube-Tisza Interfluve